Dawson County High School is the public high school of Dawsonville, Georgia, United States.

It enrolls approximately 800 students in grades 10, 11, and 12. In the 2017–2018 school year, the school began serving only grades 10–12, with grade 9 moving to the Dawson County Junior High School.

DCHS students and staff moved into the present facility (145,000 square foot, situated on 60 acres) in December 1997. Health and medical instructional facilities in addition to 12 classrooms (10,000 square feet) were added in August 2004. In 2016, the school added a $13 million "Performing Arts Center". A "College and Career Academy" facility was also added in 2019. 

The principal is Michael Negley. The school employs a full-time school nurse and a School Resource Officer (SRO). More than 60 percent of the school's staff holds a master's degree or higher. Currently there are over 70 certified personnel on staff at DCHS.

The school's teams compete as the Tigers. Sports at Dawson County High include softball, football, JROTC Raiders, and basketball.

The school also has a Fine Arts program, including Band, Drama, Chorus and Art classes. Extracurricular programs within these classes include the Dawson County Tiger Pride Marching Band and the Chamber Singers.

References

Public high schools in Georgia (U.S. state)